Farmingdale is an incorporated village on Long Island within the Town of Oyster Bay in Nassau County, New York, United States. The population was 8,189 as of the 2010 Census.

The Lenox Hills neighborhood is adjacent to Bethpage State Park and the rest of the town is within a fifteen-minute drive of the park. It is also approximately 37 mi (59 km) southeast of Midtown Manhattan and can be reached via the Ronkonkoma Branch of the LIRR. The Long Island Expressway and Seaford Oyster Bay Expressway are the best way to reach Farmingdale from the city and the mainland.

History 

The first European settler in the area was Thomas Powell, who arrived in 1687. On October 18, 1695, he purchased a  tract of land from three Native American tribes.  This is known as the Bethpage Purchase and includes what is now Farmingdale, as well as Bethpage, Melville, North Massapequa, Old Bethpage, Plainedge, and Plainview.  One of two houses he built in the area (circa 1738) still stands on Merritts Road in Farmingdale.

In the 1830s, anticipating construction of the Long Island Rail Road (LIRR), land developer Ambrose George purchased a large tract of land between a community then known as Bethpage and an area in Suffolk County known as Hardscrabble.
He built a general store in the western part of this property which he named Farmingdale. When the LIRR started service to the area in October 1841,
it used the name Farmingdale for its latest stop, here, on the line it was building to Greenport. Stagecoaches took people from the Farmingdale station to Islip, Babylon, Patchogue, Oyster Bay South, and West Neck (Huntington area).

In 1886 a fire department was organized. The Village of Farmingdale was incorporated in 1904. In 1912, the State Agricultural and Technical school was established. The Lenox Hills Country Club, an 18-hole private golf course designed by Devereux Emmet, was developed north of the community in 1923 and was owned and operated by Benjamin F. Yoakum. This golf course was purchased by the State of New York, was greatly expanded, and then re-opened as Bethpage State Park in 1932, with much of the golf design work carried out by golf architect A.W. Tillinghast, later inducted into the World Golf Hall of Fame. The original 1920s era Lenox Hills subdivision and later adjacent subdivisions, located between the Bethpage State Park golf courses and the Long Island Railroad trackage, encompassing rolling hills and a wide boulevard, are known as the more upscale part of Farmingdale Village. Later, Farmingdale became a locus for the aircraft industry, notably Republic Aviation Company.

In 1899, Mile-a-Minute Murphy rode a bicycle along the Long Island Rail Road's Central Branch through the Farmingdale area at a mile a minute. For many years, the town celebrated its birth with the annual Hardscrabble Fair, with music, food and games. It was normally held in May.

, the mayor was Ralph Ekstrand.

Usage of name 
Farmingdale is also associated with several unincorporated areas outside the village limits, including South Farmingdale (also in the Town of Oyster Bay within Nassau County), and East Farmingdale (in the Town of Babylon within  Suffolk County). Many nearby places not within the village limits have Farmingdale as their postal address and the same 11735 ZIP code. Residents of East Farmingdale must use Farmingdale as their mailing address, and residents of South Farmingdale can use either Farmingdale or South Farmingdale. Bethpage State Park, which is mostly in Old Bethpage, also has a Farmingdale mailing address. Farmingdale Union Free School District (UFSD 22) includes parts of both Nassau County and Suffolk County and the southernmost part of Bethpage State Park, where the clubhouse is located. A road sign on Main Street in the south-east section of South Farmingdale (and over a mile from the Village of Farmingdale) welcomes travelers to Farmingdale. Farmingdale is also the name of the local Farmingdale Water District and Farmingdale Fire District, both of which also include areas outside the boundaries of the Village of Farmingdale. Farmingdale State College and Republic Airport are in East Farmingdale, both with Farmingdale mailing addresses.

Geography 

Between the 1990 Census and the 2000 census, the village gained territory.

Climate

According to the Köppen Climate Classification system, Farmingdale has a humid subtropical climate, abbreviated "Cfa" on climate maps.

Demographics

2010 Census
As of the 2010 census The population of the village was 88.2% White, 71.1% Non-Hispanic White, 2.6% African American, 0.4% Native American, 2.5% Asian, 0.0% Pacific Islander, 4.7% from other races, and 1.7% from two or more races. Hispanic or Latino of any race were 13.7% of the population.

2000 Census
At the 2000 census there were 8,399 people, 3,216 households, and 2,051 families in the village. The population density was 7,432.2 people per square mile (2,869.8/km). There were 3,289 housing units at an average density of 2,910.4 per square mile (1,123.8/km).  The racial makup of the village was 87.03% White, 1.61% African American, 0.12% Native American, 3.70% Asian, 0.05% Pacific Islander, 5.06% from other races, and 2.43% from two or more races. Hispanic or Latino of any race were 12.57%.

Of the 3,216 households 28.3% had children under the age of 18 living with them, 50.2% were married couples living together, 9.5% had a female householder with no husband present, and 36.2% were non-families. 29.8% of households were one person and 11.5% were one person aged 65 or older. The average household size was 2.55 and the average family size was 3.19.

The age distribution was 21.2% under the age of 18, 7.3% from 18 to 24, 35.2% from 25 to 44, 21.6% from 45 to 64, and 14.7% 65 or older. The median age was 38 years. For every 100 females, there were 95.2 males. For every 100 females age 18 and over, there were 92.5 males.

The median household income was $58,411 and the median family income  was $68,235. Males had a median income of $46,104 versus $36,021 for females. The per capita income for the village was $27,492. About 3.0% of families and 5.6% of the population were below the poverty line, including 3.5% of those under age 18 and 13.0% of those age 65 or over.

Transportation 
Farmingdale is served by Republic Airport, a major general aviation reliever to the east of New York City; NICE routes n70, n71 and n72; and the Long Island Rail Road's Farmingdale station. Major roads are New York State routes 24 (Conklin Street), 109 (Fulton Street), 110 (Broad Hollow Road), Southern State Parkway, Bethpage State Parkway, and 27 (NY 27). The village is the site of a transit-oriented development centered around the LIRR station.
A Long Island Greenway is planned from Farmingdale to Montauk.

Notable people 
 Barbara Stern Burstin, Holocaust scholar 
 Gregory W. Carman, US Congressman
 Ryan Cruthers, professional hockey player
 Matt Danowski, professional lacrosse player
 Dan Domenech, theater actor
 William Gaddis, U.S. novelist
 Peter J. Ganci Jr. (1946–2001), Chief of Department of the FDNY who died during the September 11 terrorist attacks.
 George Hincapie, professional bicycle racer
 Howard T. Hogan, New York State Supreme Court Justice
 Tom Kennedy, professional football player for the Detroit Lions
 Ed Kranepool, baseball player, lived in South Farmingdale for many years
 Tim Kubart, actor, Grammy Award-winning musician
 April Lawton, musician and artist, member of Ramatam.
 SallyAnn Salsano, producer of MTV reality shows including Jersey Shore via her 495 Productions company (named for the interstate passing by the community)
 William T. Schwendler (1904–1978), executive vice president and chairman of the board, Grumman Corporation
 George F. Titterton (1904–1998), senior vice president, Grumman Corporation
 Al Weis, baseball player
 Canute Curtis, former American college (West Virginia) and professional football (Cincinnati Bengals) player

Colleges
 State University of New York at Farmingdale, 2350 Broadhollow Rd., Farmingdale, NY 11735-1021

See also
 Earth Sound Research
 Stern's Pickle Works
 Saint Charles Cemetery
 Adventureland (New York), a Farmingdale amusement park.
 Stew Leonard's, a New England supermarket chain with a store in Farmingdale

References

External links

 Farmingdale official website
 Village history 
 Farmingdale-Bethpage Historical Society website
 Farmingdale Public School District website
 Farmingdale Chamber of Commerce website
 Detailed Zoning Map of Village

Oyster Bay (town), New York
Villages in Nassau County, New York
Villages in New York (state)